Tom Welo (born 23 September 1947) is a Norwegian former rower. He competed in the men's coxed four event at the 1972 Summer Olympics.

References

External links
 

1947 births
Living people
Norwegian male rowers
Olympic rowers of Norway
Rowers at the 1972 Summer Olympics
Rowers from Oslo
World Rowing Championships medalists for Norway